Gymnobela procera is a species of sea snail, a marine gastropod mollusk in the family Raphitomidae.

Description
The length of the shell attains 32 mm.

Distribution
This marine species occurs at the Loyalty Ridge off New Caledonia.

References

 Sysoev, A. & Bouchet, P., 2001. New and uncommon turriform gastropods (Gastropoda: Conoidea) from the south-west Pacific. Mémoires du Muséum national d'Histoire naturelle 185: 271-320

External links
 MNHN, Paris: holotype
 Gastropods.com: Gymnobela procera
 

procera
Gastropods described in 2001